Whitney Maria Behr (born September 25, 1981) is an American Earth Scientist known for her contributions to understanding mechanics and kinematics of deformation in Earth's lithosphere. She was educated in the United States following which she held academic positions there. Since 2018, she has been the chair of the  Structural Geology & Tectonics Group in the Geological Institute at ETH Zürich.

Early life, education and family 
Whitney Maria Behr was born on September 25, 1981 in Los Angeles, California, United States. Behr completed her B.S in Geology in May, 2006 at California State University, Northridge. She went on to do her doctoral studies in structural geology and active tectonics at University of Southern California under the supervision of John P. Platt.

She holds professional affiliations with the Geological Society of America, American Geophysical Union, the Earth Science Women's Network and Sigma Xi.

She is married, currently resides in Zürich and has a son, aged 5.

Academic career 
She did her doctoral studies in structural geology and active tectonics at University of Southern California under the supervision of John P. Platt. After receiving her PhD in 2011, she worked as a Post-Doctoral Research Fellow at the Department of Geological Sciences at Brown University under the supervision of Greg Hirth till June, 2012. From August, 2012 to June, 2018, Whitney held the post of Assistant Professor at the  Jackson School of Geosciences, University of Texas at Austin. Since July, 2018, she holds the chair of the Structural Geology and Tectonics group at the Department of Earth Science in ETH Zurich.

Her primary research interests are the mechanics and kinematics of deformation in the Earth's lithosphere, rheology of the crust and upper mantle, strain localisation, rock mechanics, tectonic geomorphology, Quaternary geochronology, quantifying slip rates and earthquake hazards. Her research methodology combines field, analytical and experimental techniques to improve understanding of deformation at active and ancient plate margins. She has made contributions toward understanding the link between deformation of slow ductile flow and rapid seismogenic movements of brittle lithosphere. This helped improve understanding of seismic hazard potential. She investigated the differences between slip rates measured geodetic methods and geological slip rates. The work contributed toward understanding of intracontinental subduction zones.

She has extensive field experience spanning California (Mojave desert, Coachella Valley, Klamath Mountains); Betic Cordillera in southern Spain; Syros Island in Greece; Rio Grande in New Mexico; Kenai Peninsula in Alaska; Northeastern China; Morocco in Northern Africa.

Awards and recognition 
In 2019, she received the Presidential Early Career Award for Scientists and Engineers. In 2016, she received the Young Scientist Award (Donath Medal) awarded by the Geological Society of America. In 2013, Whitney Behr received Doris M. Curtis Outstanding Woman in Science Award for her significant contribution toward Geosciences in her PhD.

References 

1981 births
Living people
American earth scientists
California State University, Northridge alumni
University of Southern California alumni
University of Texas at Austin faculty
Academic staff of ETH Zurich